Karlskoga Airport , is an airport in the municipality of Karlskoga, Örebro, Sweden. Located 3 km (1.8 mi) northwest of Karlskoga. It served as a regional airport and operated flights to Stockholm Arlanda Airport until 1991, in the 1980s to Bromma Airport, Oslo, and Copenhagen. The airport stopped civilian passenger air traffic flights when arms manufacturer Bofors changed its flights to Örebro Airport.

The airport hosts several events, such as air shows open to the public.

Statistics

See also 

 List of airports in Sweden

References

External links 

 

Airports in Sweden
Buildings and structures in Karlskoga Municipality
Bofors